Bhale Adrushtavo Adrushta (Kannada: ಭಲೇ ಅದೃಷ್ಟವೋ ಅದೃಷ್ಟ) is a 1971 Indian Kannada film, directed by K. S. L. Swamy. The film stars Kalpana, B. V. Radha, Gangadhar and Srinath in the lead roles. The film has musical score by Vijaya Bhaskar. This film is known to be the first film in South India to be shot and released in ORWO Color.

Cast

Kalpana
Gangadhar
B. V. Radha
Srinath
K. S. Ashwath
Sampath (Kannada actor)
Balakrishna
Dwarakish
Thoogudeepa Srinivas
M. N. Lakshmi Devi
Advani Lakshmi Devi
B. Jaya
B. Jayashree
Chi. Udaya Shankar
Shivaram
Ramesh in Special Appearance

Soundtrack
The music was composed by Vijaya Bhaskar.

References

External links
 
 

1971 films
1970s Kannada-language films
Films scored by Vijaya Bhaskar
Films directed by K. S. L. Swamy